Piletocera penicillalis is a moth in the family Crambidae. It was described by Hugo Theodor Christoph in 1881. It is found in the Russian Far East (Amur).

References

penicillalis
Moths described in 1881
Moths of Asia